Dendrocopos is a widespread genus of woodpeckers from Asia, Europe and Northern Africa. The species range from the Philippines to the British Isles.

Taxonomy
The genus Dendrocopos was introduced in 1816 by the German naturalist Carl Ludwig Koch.  The name combines the Ancient Greek dendron meaning "tree" with kopos meaning "striking". The type species was designated as the great spotted woodpecker (Dendrocopos major) by the Scottish ornithologist Edward Hargitt in 1890 in his catalogue of woodpeckers in the collection of the British Museum.

The genus at one time contained around 25 species. A molecular phylogenetic analysis of the pied woodpeckers published in 2015 found that Dendrocopos was polyphyletic. In the rearranged genera the number of species in Dendrocopos was reduced to 12 as listed below.

Species

References

Further reading

 
Bird genera
 
Taxa named by Carl Ludwig Koch